Apalaí is a Cariban language spoken in Brazil. Approximately 450 people speak Apalaí. It is an agglutinative language which uses a rare object–verb–subject word order.

References

External links

Cariban languages
Languages of Brazil
Agglutinative languages
Object–verb–subject languages